UK TV may refer to:

Television in the United Kingdom
UKTV, a television network in the UK
BBC UKTV, a BBC TV channel in Australia and New Zealand 
Granada UKTV, a former name of ITV Choice, a channel broadcasting to parts of the Middle East, Africa, Asia and Malta